Dear Me may refer to:

 Dear Me (book), 1977 autobiography by Peter Ustinov
 "Dear Me" (Lorrie Morgan song), released in 1989
 "Dear Me" (Slushii song), a 2017 song by Slushii from the album Out of Light
 "Dear Me", a 2020 song by Taeyeon from the repackage edition of her 2019 album Purpose